General Dynamics Corporation (GD) is an American publicly traded, aerospace and defense corporation headquartered in Reston, Virginia. As of 2020, it was the fifth-largest defense contractor in the world by arms sales, and 5th largest in the United States by total sales. The company is a Fortune 100 company, and was ranked  in 2022.

Formed in 1954 with the merger of submarine manufacturer Electric Boat and aircraft manufacturer Canadair, the corporation today consists of ten subsidiary companies with operations in 45 countries.  The company's products include Gulfstream business jets, Virginia- and Columbia-class nuclear-powered submarines, Arleigh Burke-class guided-missile destroyers, M1 Abrams tanks and Stryker armored fighting vehicles.

In 2022, General Dynamics had worldwide sales of $39.4 billion and a workforce of approximately 106,500 full-time employees. The current chairman and chief executive officer (CEO) is Phebe Novakovic.

History

Electric Boat

General Dynamics traces its ancestry to John Philip Holland's Holland Torpedo Boat Company. In 1899, Isaac Rice bought the company from Holland and renamed it Electric Boat Company. Electric Boat was responsible for developing the U.S. Navy's first modern submarines which were purchased by the Navy in 1900.

In 1906, Electric Boat subcontracted submarine construction to the Fore River Shipyard in Quincy, Massachusetts, to build the submarines they had designed and won contracts for. Between 1917 and 1924, the company was named Submarine Boat Corporation. In 1933 Electric Boat acquired ownership of a shipyard in Groton, Connecticut, to build submarines. The first submarine built in Groton to be delivered to the U.S. Navy was USS Cuttlefish in 1934.

Electric Boat was cash-flush but lacking in work following World War II, during which it produced 80 submarines for the Navy, with its workforce shrinking from 13,000 to 4,000 by 1946. President and chief executive officer John Jay Hopkins started looking for companies that would fit into Electric Boat's market in hopes of diversifying.

Canadair purchase
Canadair was owned by the Canadian government and was suffering from the same post-war malaise as Electric Boat. It was up for sale, and Hopkins bought the company for $10 million in 1946. The factory alone was worth more than $22 million, according to the Canadian government's calculations, excluding the value of the remaining contracts for planes or spare parts. However, Canadair's production line and inventory systems were in disorder when Electric Boat purchased the company. Hopkins hired Canadian-born mass-production specialist H. Oliver West to take over the president's role and return Canadair to profitability. Shortly after the takeover, Canadair began delivering its new Canadair North Star (a version of the Douglas DC-4) and was able to deliver aircraft to Trans-Canada Airlines, Canadian Pacific Airlines, and British Overseas Airways Corporation (BOAC) well in advance of their contracted delivery times.

Defense spending increased with the onset of the Cold War, and Canadair went on to win many Canadian military contracts for the Royal Canadian Air Force and became a major aerospace company. These included Canadair CT-133 Silver Star trainer, the Canadair Argus long-range maritime reconnaissance and transport aircraft, and the Canadair F-86 Sabre. Between 1950 and 1958, 1,815 Sabres were built.  Canadair also produced 200 CF-104 Starfighter supersonic fighter aircraft, a license-built version of the Lockheed F-104.

In 1976, General Dynamics sold Canadair to the Canadian Government for $38 million. Canadair was acquired by Bombardier Inc. in 1986.

General Dynamics emerges
Aircraft production became increasingly important at Canadair, and Hopkins argued that the name "Electric Boat" was no longer appropriate—so Electric Boat was reorganized as General Dynamics on 24 April 1952.

General Dynamics purchased Convair from the Atlas Group in March 1953. The sale was approved by government oversight with the provision that GD would continue to operate out of Air Force Plant 4 in Fort Worth, Texas. This factory had been set up in order to spread out strategic aircraft production and rented to Convair during the war to produce B-24 Liberator bombers.

Convair worked as an independent division inside General Dynamics and over the next decade developed the F-106 Delta Dart interceptor, the B-58 Hustler bomber, and the Convair 880 and 990 airliners. Convair also developed the Atlas missile, the US's first operational intercontinental ballistic missile.

General Dynamics purchased Liquid Carbonic Corporation in September 1957 and controlled it as a wholly owned subsidiary until a Federal antitrust ruling required its sale to shareholders in January 1969, being bought later that month by Houston Natural Gas Company.

Management churn
Hopkins fell seriously ill during 1957 and was eventually replaced by Frank Pace later that year. Meanwhile, John Naish succeeded Joseph McNarney as president of Convair. Chicago industrialist Henry Crown became the company's largest shareholder and merged his Material Service Corporation with GD in 1959.

GD subsequently reorganized into Eastern Group in New York City and Western Group in San Diego, California, with the latter taking over all of the aerospace activities and dropping the Convair brand name from its aircraft in the process.

Frank Pace retired under pressure in 1962 and Roger Lewis, former Assistant Secretary of the Air Force and Pan American Airways CEO, was brought in as CEO.  The company recovered, then fell back into the same struggles.  In 1970, the board brought in McDonnell Douglas president Dave Lewis (no relation) as chairman and CEO, who served until retiring in 1985.

Aviation in the 1960s
During the early 1960s the company bid on the United States Air Force's Tactical Fighter, Experimental (TFX) project for a new low-level "penetrator". Robert McNamara, newly installed as the Secretary of Defense, forced a merger of the TFX with U.S. Navy plans for a new long-range "fleet defender" aircraft. Since GD lacked experience designing naval aircraft, it partnered with Grumman to develop a version for aircraft carrier operations. After four rounds of bids and changes, the GD/Grumman team finally won the contract over a Boeing submission.

The land-based F-111 first flew in December 1964; the carrier-capable F-111B flew in May 1965, but proved overweight and underpowered for the navy's needs. With the naval version not accepted, production estimates for 2,400 F-111s including exports were sharply reduced, but GD still made a $300-million profit on the project. Grumman went on to use many of the innovations of the F-111 in the F-14 Tomcat, an aircraft designed solely as a carrier-borne fighter.

Reorganization
In May 1965, GD reorganized into 12 operating divisions based on product lines. The board decided to build all future planes in Fort Worth, ending plane production at Convair's original plant in San Diego but continuing with space and missile development there. In October 1970, Roger Lewis left and David S. Lewis from McDonnell Douglas was named CEO. Lewis required that the company headquarters move to St. Louis, Missouri, which occurred in February 1971.

F-16 success

In 1972, GD bid on the USAF's Lightweight Fighter (LWF) project. GD and Northrop were awarded prototype contracts. GD's F-111 program was winding down, and the company needed a new aircraft contract. It organized its own version of Lockheed's Skunk Works, the Advanced Concepts Laboratory, and responded with a new aircraft design incorporating advanced technologies.

GD's YF-16 first flew in January 1974 and proved to have slightly better performance than the YF-17 in head-to-head testing. It entered production as the F-16 in January 1975 with an initial order of 650 and a total order of 1,388. The F-16 also won contracts worldwide, beating the F-17 in foreign competition as well. GD built an aircraft production factory in Fort Worth, Texas.  F-16 orders eventually totaled more than 4,600, making it the company's largest and most successful program.

Land Systems and Marine Systems focus

In 1976, General Dynamics sold the struggling Canadair back to the Canadian government for $38 million. By 1984, General Dynamics had four divisions: Convair in San Diego, General Dynamics-Fort Worth, General Dynamics-Pomona, and General Dynamics-Electronics. In 1985 a further reorganization created the Space Systems Division from the Convair Space division. In 1985, GD also acquired Cessna.  In 1986 the Pomona division (which mainly produced the Standard Missile and the Phalanx CIWS for the navy) was split up, creating the Valley Systems Division.  Valley Systems produced the Stinger surface-to-air missile and the Rolling Airframe Missile (RAM).  Both units were recombined into one entity in 1992.

Henry Crown, still GD's largest shareholder, died on 15 August 1990. Following this, the company started to rapidly divest its under-performing divisions under CEO William Anders. Cessna was re-sold to Textron in January 1992, the San Diego and Pomona missile production units to General Motors-Hughes Aerospace in May 1992, the Fort Worth aircraft production to Lockheed in March 1993 (a nearby electronics production facility was separately sold to Israeli-based Elbit Systems, marking that company's entry into the US market), and its Space Systems Division to Martin Marietta in 1994. The remaining Convair Aircraft Structure unit was sold to McDonnell Douglas in 1994. The remains of the Convair Division were simply closed in 1996. GD's exit from the aviation world was short-lived, and in 1999 the company acquired Gulfstream Aerospace.  The Pomona operation was closed shortly after its sale to Hughes Aircraft.

In 1995, General Dynamics purchased the privately held Bath Iron Works shipyard in Bath, Maine, for $300 million, diversifying its shipbuilding portfolio to include U.S. Navy surface ships such as guided-missile destroyers. In 1998, the company acquired NASSCO, formerly National Steel and Shipbuilding Company, for $415 million. The San Diego shipyard produces U.S. Navy auxiliary and support ships as well as commercial ships that are eligible to be U.S.-flagged under the Jones Act.

Having divested itself of its aviation holdings, GD concentrated on land and sea products. GD purchased Chrysler's defense divisions in 1982, renaming them General Dynamics Land Systems. In 2003, it purchased the defense divisions of General Motors as well. It is now a major supplier of armored vehicles of all types, including the M1 Abrams, LAV 25, Stryker, and a wide variety of vehicles based on these chassis.  Force Protection, Inc. was acquired by General Dynamics Land Systems in November 2011 for $350 million.

General Dynamics UK

In 1997, General Dynamics acquired Computing Devices Ltd based in Hastings, England which had developed avionics and mission systems for the Panavia Tornado, British Aerospace Harrier II and Hawker Siddeley Nimrod. In 2001, Computing Devices Canada (CDC) was awarded a contract from the UK Ministry of Defence to supply tactical communication systems for their Bowman program. The work for this was carried out at its new UK headquarters in Oakdale, Wales and the company was renamed General Dynamics UK Limited. , it comprises two business units: General Dynamics Land Systems - UK and General Dynamics Mission Systems - UK and operates in eight sites across the United Kingdom. It is currently responsible for delivering the General Dynamics Ajax family of armored vehicles, the Foxhound light protected patrol vehicle and the Morpheus communications system to the UK Ministry of Defence.

Recent history

In 2004, General Dynamics bid for the UK company Alvis plc, the leading British manufacturer of armored vehicles. In March the board of Alvis Vickers voted in favor of the £309m takeover. However at the last minute BAE Systems offered £355m for the company.  This deal was finalized in June 2004.

On August 19, 2008, GD agreed to pay $4 million to settle a lawsuit brought by the US Government claiming that a GD unit fraudulently billed the government for defectively manufactured parts used in US military aircraft and submarines.  The US alleged that GD defectively manufactured or failed to test parts used in US military aircraft from September 2001 to August 2003, such as for the C-141 Starlifter transport plane. The GD unit involved, based in Glen Cove, New York, closed in 2004.

In 2014, the government of Canada announced it had selected the General Dynamics Land Systems subsidiary in London, Ontario, to produce Light Armoured Vehicles for Saudi Arabia as part of a $10 billion deal with the Canadian Commercial Corporation.  The sale has been criticized by political opponents because of the Saudi Arabian-led intervention in Yemen. In December 2018, after Prime Minister Justin Trudeau suggested Canada might scrap the deal, the company warned that doing so could lead to "billions of dollars in liability" and risk the loss of thousands of jobs.  Trudeau has since said that while he is critical of Saudi conduct, he cannot simply scrap the deal because "Canada as a country of the rule of law needs to respect its contracts."  On 30 January 2019, CEO Phebe Novakovic warned investors that the matter had "significantly impacted" the company's cash flow because Saudi Arabia was nearly $2 billion in arrears on its payments.

In 2018, General Dynamics acquired information technology services giant CSRA for $9.7 billion, and merged it with GDIT.

General Dynamics has been accused by groups such as Code Pink and Green America of "making money from human suffering by profiting off the migrant children held at U.S. detention camps" due to its IT services contracts with the Department of Health and Human Services' Office of Refugee Resettlement, the government agency that operates shelters for unaccompanied children to include those separated from their families as part of the Trump administration family separation policy. The company says it has no role in constructing or operating detention centers, and that its contracts to provide training and technical services began in 2000 and have spanned across four presidential administrations.

It was announced in September 2018 that the U.S. Navy awarded contracts for 10 new Arleigh Burke-class destroyers from General Dynamics Bath Iron Works and Huntington Ingalls Industries.

Former U.S. Secretary of Defense General Jim Mattis re-joined the company's board of directors in August 2019.  He had previously served on the board, but resigned and divested before becoming Secretary of Defense.

In September 2020, General Dynamics announced a strategic counter-drone partnership, providing General Dynamics' global network with access to Dedrone's complete drone detection and defeat technology.

In December 2020, the board of directors for General Dynamics announced a regular quarterly dividend of $1.10, payable on February 5, 2021.

On December 26, 2020, General Dynamics confirmed that their business division General Dynamics Land Systems was awarded a $4.6 billion contract by the U.S. Army for M1A2 SEPv3 Abrams main battle tanks.

Timeline
Electric Boat was established in 1899.

20th-century acquisitions
 1946 – Canadair purchased from the Canadian government.
 1952 – Electric Boat became General Dynamics.
 1953 – Convair merged with General Dynamics.
 1955 – Acquired Stromberg-Carlson.
 1957 - Purchased Liquid Carbonic Corporation of Chicago, Illinois, on September 30.
 1959 – Henry Crown acquires company and becomes majority shareholder.
 1962–1963 – Convair-produced Mercury-Atlas rockets launch four manned Mercury missions into low Earth orbit, including John Glenn.
 1971–1985 David S. Lewis, Jr., was chairman and chief executive officer. During his tenure, General Dynamics' revenues and earnings quadrupled.
 1982 – Formed General Dynamics Land Systems after the acquisition of Chrysler's combat systems.
 1995 – Acquired Bath Iron Works from Prudential Insurance.
 1996 – Acquired Teledyne Vehicle Systems.
 1997 – Acquired Lockheed Martin Defense Systems and Lockheed Martin Armament Systems.
 1997 – Acquired Advanced Technology Systems, formerly an operating unit of Lucent Technologies.
 1997 – Acquired Computing Devices International, formerly a division of Ceridian Corporation.
 1998 – Acquired National Steel and Shipbuilding Company.
 1999 – Acquired Gulfstream Aerospace from Forstmann Little.
 1999 – Acquired GTE Government Systems, Communication Systems, Electronic Systems and Worldwide Telecommunication Systems Divisions.
 2000 – Acquired Saco Defense from New Colt Holding Corp. which owned it since 1998.

21st-century acquisitions
 2001 – Acquired PrimeX Technologies Inc.
 2001 – Acquired Galaxy Aerospace Company from Israeli Aircraft Industries (IAI).
 2001 – Acquired Spain's Santa Bárbara Sistemas, one of the world's oldest arms manufacturers.
 2002 – Acquired German company EWK Eisenwerke Kaiserslautern, and changed its name to General Dynamics European Land Systems-Germany.
 2003 – Acquired GM Defense from General Motors.
 2003 – Acquired the Austrian heavy vehicle company Steyr-Daimler-Puch Spezialfahrzeug (SSF) from an Austrian investor group and formed the basis of General Dynamics European Land Systems (GDELS).
 2003 – Acquired Veridian and Digital Systems Resources.
 2003 – Acquired Datron's Intercontinental Manufacturing Company (IMCO) Unit.
 2004 – Acquired Spectrum Astro. 
 2005 – Acquired MAYA Viz Ltd, the primary developer of the US Army's Command Post of the Future software into General Dynamics C4 Systems.
 2005 – Acquired Tadpole Computer.
 2005 – Acquired Itronix.
 2006 – Acquired FC Business Systems.
 2006 – Acquired Anteon International.
 2007 – Acquired Mediaware International.
2008 – Acquired ViPS, Inc.
2008 – Acquired Jet Aviation.
 2009 – Acquired Axletech International.
 2010 – Acquired Kylmar Ltd.
 2011 – Acquired Vangent, Inc. from The Veritas Capital Fund III, LP.
 2011 – Acquired Metro Machine Imperial Docks Inc.
 2011 – Acquired Force Protection Inc.
 2012 – Acquired Open Kernel Labs.
 2012 – Acquired Applied Physical Sciences.
 2016 - Acquired Bluefin Robotics into General Dynamics Mission Systems.
 2018 – Acquired CSRA Inc. for about $6.8 billion.

Divestitures
 1967 – General Atomics was sold to Gulf Oil.
 1969 - Forced by Federal order to divest itself of Liquid Carbonic Corporation in January; Liquid Carbonic was then purchased by Houston Natural Gas Co.
 1976 – Canadair sold back to the Canadian government.
 1981 – Following expropriation legislation passed by the government of the Province of Quebec, General Dynamics' Canadian subsidiary sold its 54.6% controlling interest in Asbestos Corporation Limited to the Quebec government-owned corporation, Société nationale de l'amiante (SNA).
 1991 – Data Systems Division sold to Computer Sciences Corporation.
 1992 – Tactical Missiles Division to Hughes Aircraft Company
 1992 – Cessna was sold to Textron.
 1992 – Electronics Division sold to Carlyle Group of Washington, D.C. and renamed GDE Systems.
 1993 – Fort Worth Division, a producer of fixed-wing military aircraft, was sold to Lockheed Corporation.
 1993 – Space Systems Division was sold to Martin Marietta.
 1994 – Convair's aerostructures unit's manufacturing work in San Diego was transferred to McDonnell Douglas.
 2006 – Material Service to Hanson.
 2007 – Freeman United Coal Mining Co. sold to Springfield Coal Co. for an undisclosed amount.
 2010 – Spacecraft development and manufacturing (a business group within the Advanced Information Systems division) to Orbital Sciences Corporation.
 2014 – Advanced Systems (another business line within Advanced Information Systems) to MacDonald, Dettwiler and Associates

Company outline

Business units
As of 2021, General Dynamics consists of ten separate businesses organised as four operating segments:

 Aerospace
 Gulfstream
 Jet Aviation

 Marine Systems
 Electric Boat
 Bath Iron Works
 NASSCO

 Combat Systems
 General Dynamics Land Systems
 General Dynamics European Land Systems
 General Dynamics Ordnance and Tactical Systems

Technologies
 GDIT
 General Dynamics Mission Systems

Aircraft systems
General Dynamics F-111 Aardvark
General Dynamics-Grumman F-111B
General Dynamics F-111C
General Dynamics F-111K
General Dynamics–Grumman EF-111A Raven
General Dynamics F-16 Fighting Falcon
General Dynamics F-16 VISTA
General Dynamics F-16XL
General Dynamics F-16 Fighting Falcon variants
Martin/General Dynamics RB-57F Canberra

Marine systems
American Overseas Marine Corporation
Bath Iron Works
Electric Boat
National Steel and Shipbuilding Company
Quincy Shipbuilding Division (closed 1986)

Missile systems
RIM-24 Tartar
FIM-43 Redeye
MIM-46 Mauler
RIM-66 Standard
AGM-78 Standard ARM
FIM-92 Stinger
AIM-97 Seekbat
RIM-116 Rolling Airframe Missile
AGM-129 ACM
Tomahawk (missile)
BGM-109G Ground Launched Cruise Missile
SM-65 Atlas (CGM/HGM-16)

Combat systems

Former General Dynamics Pomona Division
Phalanx CIWS
General Dynamics Land Systems
General Dynamics Robotic Systems
Autonomous Navigation System
Mobile Detection and Assessment Response System
Unmanned Surface Vehicle
 Expeditionary tank
 M1 Abrams series main battle tank
 Expeditionary Fighting Vehicle
 Heavy Assault Bridge program
 LAV series
 Stryker Armored Combat Vehicle
 XM2001 Crusader self-propelled howitzer
General Dynamics Armament and Technical Products
 GAU-17 (Minigun)
 GAU-19
General Dynamics Ordnance and Tactical Systems
General Dynamics European Land Systems (GDELS)
GDELS-Steyr
ASCOD AFV (Ulan)
Pandur II
GDELS-Mowag
Mowag Duro
Mowag Eagle
Mowag Piranha
GDELS-Santa Bárbara Sistemas
Leopard 2E
ASCOD AFV (Pizarro)
General Dynamics United Kingdom Limited
Scout SV

Information Systems and Technology
Information Systems and Technology represent 34% of the company's revenue as of 2014.

Launch vehicles
 Atlas (rocket family)
Atlas-Centaur
Atlas E/F
Atlas G
Atlas H
Atlas SLV-3
Atlas-Agena
 NEXUS (rocket) space launch vehicle concept (never built)

Corporate governance
General Dynamics current chairman and chief executive officer is Phebe N. Novakovic.

As of December 2022.

Financials
General Dynamics has $30.9 billion in sales as of 2017 primarily military, but also civilian with its Gulfstream Aerospace unit and conventional shipbuilding and repair with its National Steel and Shipbuilding subsidiary.

For the fiscal year 2022, General Dynamics reported net income of US$3.309 billion, with an annual revenue of US$39.407 billion, an increase of 2.44% over the previous fiscal cycle. General Dynamics's shares traded at over $254 per share in 2022, and its market capitalization was valued at US$62.46 billion in December 2022.

As of January 2023.

Carbon emissions 
General Dynamics reported Total CO2e emissions (Direct + Indirect) for 2021 at 696,118 mt (-8.7% year over year) and aims to reducing greenhouse gas emissions 40% by 2034. The company is on track to become carbon neutral before 2060.

Company demographics 
In 2021, General Dynamics's U.S. workforce was 21% veterans, 23% female, and 27% people of color. The US Department of Labor awarded the company the 2021 HIRE Vets Gold Award. The company has 26 Employee Resource Groups serving 10 employee segments. Approximately 20% of the company's employees are represented by labor unions such as International Association of Machinists and Aerospace Workers (IAM), The International Union, and United Auto Workers (UAW). Independent research published by American Association of People with Disabilities (AAPD), U.S. Department of Labor, Military Times, U.S. Veterans Magazine, Professional Women's Magazine, Forbes, and Fortune Magazine selected General Dynamics as a top employer.  General Dynamics' community contributions in 2021 were 70% in Education & Social Services, 18% in Arts & Culture, and 12% in Service Member Support.

See also

 Top 100 Contractors of the U.S. federal government
 List of companies headquartered in Northern Virginia
 List of military aircraft of the United States
 List of United States defense contractors
 List of current ships of the United States Navy
 List of currently active United States military land vehicles
 List of shipbuilders and shipyards

References

Citations

Sources

 Patents owned by General Dynamics Corporation. US Patent & Trademark Office. URL accessed on 5 December 2005.
  from a GeoCities-hosted website
 Compton-Hall, Richard. The Submarine Pioneers. Sutton Publishing, 1999.
 Franklin, Roger. The Defender: The Story of General Dynamics. Harper & Row, 1986.
 General Dynamics. Dynamic America. General Dynamics/Doubleday Publishing Company, 1960.
 Goodwin, Jacob. Brotherhood of Arms: General Dynamics and the Business of Defending America. Random House, 1985.
 Pederson, Jay P. (Ed.). International Directory of Company Histories, Volume 40. St. James Press, March 2001.  . (General Dynamics section, pp. 204–210). See also International Directory of Company Histories, Volume 86. St. James Press, July 2007.  (General Dynamics/Electric Boat Corporation section, pp. 136–139).
 Morris, Richard Knowles. John P. Holland 1841–1914, Inventor of the Modern Submarine. The University of South Carolina Press, 1998. (Book originally copyrighted and published by the United States Naval Institute Press, 1966.)
 Morris, Richard Knowles. Who Built Those Subs?. United States Naval Institute Press, October 1998. (125th Anniversary issue)
 Rodengen, Jeffrey. The Legend of Electric Boat, Serving The Silent Service. Write Stuff Syndicate, 1994. Account revised in 2007.

External links

 Official General Dynamics web site
 General Dynamics European Land Systems (Gdels.com) site

 
Defense companies of the United States
Conglomerate companies of the United States
Aerospace companies of the United States
Aircraft manufacturers of the United States
Information technology companies of the United States
Shipbuilding companies of the United States
Multinational companies headquartered in the United States
Manufacturing companies based in Virginia
Companies based in Reston, Virginia
American companies established in 1952
Conglomerate companies established in 1952
Electronics companies established in 1952
Manufacturing companies established in 1952
Technology companies established in 1952
1952 establishments in Virginia
Companies listed on the New York Stock Exchange
Science and technology in Virginia